Sir Edward Hunt (c.1730–1787) was a British shipbuilder and designer who rose to be Surveyor of the Navy.

Life

He was born around 1730.

He is first recorded in the service of the Royal Navy as a Master Boat Builder in 1757 at Portsmouth Dockyard. This position was usually preceded by an apprenticeship as a ship's carpenter on a Royal Navy ship, plus a period as ship's carpenter both at sea and on shore. In 1762 he was appointed Assistant Master Shipwright at Sheerness Dockyard then was promoted first to Master Caulker. In 1765 he moved to Woolwich Dockyard as Assistant Master Shipwright. In 1767 he was given full charge (as Master Shipwright) at Sheerness Dockyard and from that time the Royal Navy list his works. In 1772 he moved to the far larger dock at Portsmouth.

In April 1778 he was appointed Surveyor of the Navy to assist Sir John Williams. From December 1784 he was the senior Surveyor and was working with John Henslow.

He ceased work in December 1786 and died within a few weeks, his will being probated on 31 January 1787.

Ships Built

HMS Portland (1770) 50-gun ship of the line launched at Harwich
HMS Berwick (1775) 74-gun ship of the line launched at Portsmouth
HMS Sphinx (1775) 20-gun ship
HMS Cygnet (1776) 14-gun sloop
HMS Swift (1777) 14-gun sloop
HMS Lion (1777) 64-gun ship of the line launched at Portsmouth

Ships Designed

Active-class frigate (1778) 32-gun frigates first launched in 1779
Minerva-class frigate (1778) 32-gun frigates first launched in 1780
Ganges-class ship of the line (1779) 74-gun ships of the line first launched in 1782
Perseverance-class frigate (1779) 36-fun frigates first launched in 1781
HMS Active (1779) 36-gun frigate first launched in 1780
Grampus-class ship (1780) 50-gun ships
Hermione-class frigate (1780) 32-gun frigates first launched in 1782
Echo-class sloop (1781) 16-gun sloops
HMS Trusty (1781) 50-gun ship of the line launched in 1782
Adventure-class ship (1782) 44-gun ships first launched in 1785
HMS Culloden (1782) 74-gun ship of the line launched in 1783
HMS Melampus (1782) 36-gun frigate launched in 1785
HMS Squirrel (1783) 20-gun post ship launched in 1785
HMS Caesar (1786) 80-gun ship of the line launched in 1793
HMS Retaliation (1799) 32-gun frigate - a remodelling of HMS Hermione
HMS Queen Charlotte (1805) 100-gun ship of the line launched in 1810

Family

Around 1760 he married Ann(e) Irish (d.1804). The family lived in Portsea, Portsmouth and had a London house at Blackheath.

Their first son Joseph Hunt became Director of Greenwich Hospital, London and married Catherine Davie daughter of Sir John Davie, 7th baronet.

References
 

1787 deaths
British shipbuilders
Surveyors of the Navy